Walter-André Destailleur (born in Thais, Seine, 12 June 1867 – died March 1940) was a French architect, who designed and built the Château de Trévarez (1893–1907). He was the son of the architect Hippolyte Destailleur.

References

 Midant, Jean-Paul (1996). "Destailleur. French family of architects.", vol. 8, pp. 816–817, in The Dictionary of Art, edited by Jane Turner, reprinted with minor corrections in 1998. New York: Grove. .

1867 births
1940 deaths
People from Thiais
École des Beaux-Arts alumni
19th-century French architects
20th-century French architects